"Summer Is Over" is a 1960s song, most notably sung by Dusty Springfield.

Composition
The song's music and lyrics were composed by Tom Springfield and Clive Westlake. It was originally performed by English-born Australian easy listening and country music singer Frank Ifield in 1964 and released as a single, with the B-side being  a version of Buddy Holly's "True Love Ways".

Springfield version
In September of the same year, Tom's sister, singer Dusty Springfield, the two of them having previously being together in the pop-folk vocal trio The Springfields, released the single "Losing you". She chose for its B-side her version of "Summer is Over," recorded with orchestral accompaniment directed by Ivor Raymonde. Both sides were produced by Norrie Paramor.

The single was released on 16 October 1964, entered the British chart on 28 October 1964, and went up to the 9th position. "Summer Is Over" featured in her second album titled Dusty, released in 1964. Her 1965  EP Mademoiselle Dusty included a French version of the song.

Critic Anna J. Randall wrote in 2008 that the version in which Dusty Springfield sung begins "decisively" on the "down beat" while "the minor mode darkens the energy of its rising sixteenth-note figure" and "the guitar's metallic afterbeat gives it a distinct chill." The music, she wrote, "threatens to escape the scale, paralleling, perhaps, the closely tended images of summer that threaten to slip through the singer's desperate grasp," of a vocal performance that "establishes the heroine's nightmarishly circular sense of something finishing but never ending."

Other versions
From 1964 and until it was shut down by law in 1974, the pirate radio station Radio Veronica, transmitting from a former trawler outside the Dutch territorial waters, was using the song's trumpet part for its station identification jingle.

In 1966, the Dutch singer Thérèse Steinmetz recorded a version in Dutch, being the B-side of her single 'Speel Het Spel' ('Play The Game'). The lyrics of this version are different from the later, Liesbeth List-version.

In 1982, the Dutch singer Liesbeth List released in the Netherlands a version of "Summer is Over" titled "Wie Weet" ("Who knows"), with Dutch lyrics written by T. de Winter.

References

1964 songs
1964 singles
Dusty Springfield songs
Frank Ifield songs
Songs written by Clive Westlake
Songs written by Tom Springfield
Philips Records singles
Pirate radio